Savannah Wise (born April 25, 1984) is an American actress, dancer, and singer. She played Jessica on the NBC American musical theatre dramedy television series Smash. She is also known for her work on Broadway as Evelyn Nesbit in the 2009 revival of Ragtime, originating the role of Waitress #1 and later replacing as Sherrie in Rock of Ages, and as Young Cosette in the original Broadway production of Les Misérables.

Education 
Wise earned a degree in dance from the University of Cincinnati – College-Conservatory of Music.

Career
In 2011, Wise landed the lead role of Wanda Clark in the off-Broadway musical Lucky Guy. The show opened on May 19, 2011. Originally set for a 12-week limited engagement, the show closed ten days after its opening on May 29, 2011. An original cast recording was announced and planned but never came to fruition.

Development for Smash (2009) began at Showtime by then-entertainment president Robert Greenblatt, originating from the mind of Steven Spielberg. Wise originally went in to audition for a series regular role, but landed the small role of Jessica, a member of the ensemble in the Marilyn Monroe musical, Bombshell. The role was later expanded from a small guest appearance to a recurring role. Wise appeared as Jessica in 29 of the 32 episodes. The show was cancelled after two seasons.

Personal life 
Wise is the daughter of dancer and actor Scott Wise.

Theatre credits

Sources:

Filmography

Film

Television

Discography
 2007: Go-Go Beach (Original Demo Cast Recording)
 2009: Rock of Ages (Original Broadway Cast Recording)
 2010: Not Exactly Romeo: A Multi-Media Musical Comedy (Original Demo Cast Recording)
 2010: Songs from Ragtime (2009 New Broadway Cast Recording EP)
 2011: The Last Word (Original Demo Cast Recording)
 2011: Needle in a Haystack – Single (with Kyle Dean Massey)
 2013: SMASH – The Complete Season One (Music From the NBC Television Series)
 2013: Bombshell: The New Marilyn Musical from SMASH
 2015: The Songs of Paul Fujimoto, Vol.1
Sources:

Awards and nominations

References

Living people
American television actresses
21st-century American women
1984 births
American stage actresses